Flux (also known as Liberals For Climate - The Flux Network in Western Australia), is a political movement which aims to replace the world's elected legislatures with a new system known as issue-based direct democracy (IBDD). Flux originated in and is most active in Australia, but it is also active internationally, with groups existing in the United States and Brazil.

IBDD is similar to liquid democracy, though there are differences. In IBDD, voters would still have the right to vote directly on every issue or delegate their vote to someone else, but unlike in liquid democracy, voters can choose to forgo votes on one issue to use on another issue. This creates opportunity cost between issues and allows voters to specialise their votes on the issues that are more important to them. This specialisation of votes allows citizens to participate effectively in issue-based direct democracy without having to focus on every issue as they would in regular direct democracy.

Australia
In Australia, there are Flux parties in the Australian Capital Territory, Western Australia, Queensland and New South Wales. Flux was registered at a federal level from 2016, but it was de-registered in 2022 for failing to meet the increased requirement of 1500 members.

Elections
In the 2016 Australian federal election Flux stood two senate candidates in every state, and one in the Australian Capital Territory under the name "VOTEFLUX.ORG". The group drew first preference votes of between 0.08% and 0.28% in each state, for a national average of 0.15%.

The Flux Party – WA under the banner of "Flux the System!" nominated 24 candidates for the 2017 Western Australian election. 12 in the Legislative Council and another 12 in the Legislative Assembly. They received first preference votes of between 0.31% and 0.88% in each legislative council region, for a state average of 0.44%,

The party controversially ran 26 so-called "fake independents" in the 2017 Western Australian election – candidates affiliated with the party who appeared as independents on the ballot papers.

Writing in 2020, ABC election analyst Antony Green noted that Flux "has attracted negligible support" at elections. Despite having no climate policies of any kind, the party changed its name to "Liberals for Climate - The Flux Network" for the 2021 Western Australian state election.

See also
 Online Direct Democracy

References

2016 establishments in Australia
Political parties established in 2016
Political parties in Australia
Direct democracy parties
Single-issue political parties in Australia